SDTI may stand for:

 Serial Data Transport Interface, a way of transmitting data packets
 San Diego Trolley, Inc., an American public transport operator
 Suspected deep tissue injury, a medical abbreviation